Run streaking is a form of running exercise which commits athletes to running at least one mile a day. Run streaking has gained interest in running circles and many runners encourage each other to create consistency with the run streaking commitment.

Streak Runners International and the United States Running Streak Association, two organising bodies, have lists of run streakers who have kept their streak for decades. One runner, Robert Kraft, holds a record for a 45 year running streak. Former professional soccer player and the first African American runner to run across America, Hellah Sidibe, popularized the idea and has been run streaking since May 15, 2017.

The magazine Runner's World holds a run streaking event every year from Thanksgiving to New Years Day to promote this form of exercise.

References 

Running by type